Mirage is a 2018 Spanish mystery-drama film co-written and directed by Oriol Paulo. It stars Adriana Ugarte alongside Chino Darín, Álvaro Morte, Javier Gutiérrez and Nora Navas.

Plot
In 1989, during the fall of the Berlin Wall and a 72-hour-long electrical storm, a boy named Nico, while recording a video in his house, hears some noises and sees a fight scene in his neighbors' house through a window. He goes to the house only to find the body of Ms. Weiss, the wife of the neighbor Angel Prieto. Seeing Mr. Prieto with a knife, Nico tries to escape and is accidentally hit by a car on the road. Prieto is arrested with the murder weapon in hand as Nico dies in the car accident.

In 2014, a married couple, Vera Roy and David Ortiz, move to Nico's house along with their daughter Gloria. They find an old TV set in a storeroom along with a video recorder and cassettes. An electrical storm similar to the one in 1989 begins, and after Vera, David, and Gloria watch Nico's video, the TV starts broadcasting the live news that was taking place when Nico was making his video. During dinner, they share this incident with their neighbor Aitor and his mother Clara, and Vera and David learn how Nico was killed. At night, Vera sees the boy on the TV and is shocked to find that she can interact with him. She initially gets scared but then tries to warn Nico not to go out on the road so he will not get hit.

Next morning, Vera wakes up to a new reality where no one is aware of the above incidents other than her. David is married to someone else. Gloria was never born. She is disturbed and then starts to think that, if she can interact with Nico once again, then she will be able to correct what she has done. She visits the police and tells them the entire story, which is difficult for anyone to believe. Inspector Leira  tries to help her out, but he needs some proof in order to trust her. They visit an author of the book which mentioned Nico communicating with a woman from the future via the television. They learn that during the current storm, they can communicate with Nico and try to change things. As proof, Vera tells the inspector to dig and look for the body of Ms. Weiss beneath her husband's slaughterhouse. They do so and find a human skeleton in a suitcase. The police arrest Prieto, who is now living with Aitor and Clara. During the interrogation, it is also revealed that Angel Prieto and Clara were having an affair and they were caught by Ms. Weiss, which led to a fight in which Clara accidentally stabbed Weiss. Inspector Leira helps Vera by giving her some credit card information about Nico and an address. When she visits this address, she is shocked to find David cheating on his wife with a nurse whom he met during his surgery. Vera blackmails David, who is a bank employee, to get information about Nico. She is surprised to learn that Inspector Leira is Nico Lasarte, who is in a relationship with her in this reality.

Leira tells her how he had waited for her for years and, in doing so, had unknowingly prevented her from meeting David and Aitor. Vera asks Leira to correct the events using the TV set and video recorder. Vera then commits suicide so that Leira will have to save her. Leira uses the TV and recorder to communicate with his childhood self.

Vera then wakes up to a new version of reality, which is like an earlier version where David is her husband and Gloria is her daughter, except that Nico is still alive. She finds out that David is still cheating on her. She calls the police to report a body beneath the slaughterhouse where she meets Inspector Leira, hoping to start a new relationship with him along with her daughter.

Cast

Release
Distributed by Warner Bros in Spain, the film was theatrically released on November 30, 2018. It was released on Netflix streaming on March 22, 2019.

Reception
On review aggregator Rotten Tomatoes, Mirage has an approval rating of  based on  reviews. Jonathan Holland from The Hollywood Reporter wrote: "Mirage has a great deal of satisfying complexity but little depth, and its dazzling, intricate machinery is always visible. But it still makes for a fun ride on a highly calibrated roller coaster." Pablo A. Scholz writing for the newspaper Clarín stated: "Maybe the duration is excessive (just over two hours), but the viewer will remain entertained. Janire Zurbano from the Spanish film magazine Cinemanía gave the movie two-and-a-half stars out of five and said: "[Director] Oriol Paulo succeeds in the emotional aspect, but slips in the thriller." Luis Martínez from Spanish newspaper El Mundo gave Mirage three out of five stars, concluding: "Beyond the exquisite labyrinth of lost looks, we can always be attentive to Adriana Ugarte's work, who is always at the edge." Javier Ocaña writing for El País disliked the movie and argued: "Oriol Paulo composes a commercial thriller of intrigue, of Hitchcockian airs, but that for his plot feeds on films of the contemporary cinema.

At the 2019 Gaudí Awards, Mirage was nominated for two awards, Best Actress in a Supporting Role (for Clara Segura) and Best Visual Effects.

Remake 
Indian filmmaker Anurag Kashyap adapted Mirage as the 2022 Hindi-language film Dobaaraa.

See also 
 List of Spanish films of 2018

References

External links
 
 

2010s mystery drama films
Spanish mystery drama films
Films about time travel
Adultery in films
Films set in 1989
Films set in 2014
Atresmedia Cine films
Films directed by Oriol Paulo
2010s Spanish-language films
2010s Spanish films